Notre Dame Basilica may refer to:

 Basilica of Notre-Dame de Boulogne, Boulogne-sur-Mer, France
 Basilica of Notre-Dame du Port, Clermont-Ferrond, France
 Notre-Dame de Nice, Nice, France
 Notre-Dame Basilica (Montreal), Montreal, Quebec, Canada
 Basilica of the Sacred Heart, Notre Dame, Notre Dame, Indiana, United States
 Notre-Dame Cathedral Basilica, Ottawa, Ontario, Canada
 Notre-Dame-du-Cap Basilica, Trois-Rivières, Quebec, Canada
 Saigon Notre-Dame Basilica, Saigon, Vietnam

See also

 Notre Dame (disambiguation)